Carlos Hernandez Inarejos (born 27 May 1984) is a Spanish football manager.

Career

After working in Senegal and Zambia, and working as assistant manager for Cypriot side Ermis Aradippou, Inarejos was appointed manager of Manchester 62 in Gibraltar.

On 12 July 2017, he was appointed manager of French fourth division club Mulhouse. He left the club the following year and get fourth possition in regular league.

In 2018, he was appointed manager Al Hilal club U17 (Saudi Arabia). He won the league (23W/2D/1D) and got second place in international emirates tournament (Flamengo 2 vs Al Hilal 0). In 1/2 won 4-1 against Atlético de Madrid. 

In 2019, he was appointed manager of Al Ahli (Doha) in Qatar.
He started in U23 team but after sacked coach first team he played two matches Qatar Emir cup winning both, after that he finished the league with U23 team. 

In 2020, Inarejos was appointed assistant manager of Emirati team Khor Fakkan.

On 5 January 2021, he was appointed manager of Al Shabab in Saudi Arabia. He left the club on 31 May 2021 at the end of his contract, being replaced by Péricles Chamusca.
In 19 matches he won 12 and get the second place in Saudi Pro League qualifying for Asian Champion League. 

On 23 September 2021, Inarejos signed contract with Ukrainian Second League club Karpaty Halych.

On 28 June 2022, Inarejos was appointed as manager of Saudi First Division League club Al-Arabi. He was sacked on 4 October 2022 after just 6 games in charge. 2 won, 4 draw and 0 defeats

Managerial Statistics

References

External links
 
 Carlos Inarejos at playmakerstats.com

Spanish football managers
Expatriate football managers in Saudi Arabia
Expatriate football managers in France
Expatriate football managers in Ukraine
Spanish expatriate sportspeople in France
Spanish expatriates in Saudi Arabia
Spanish expatriate sportspeople in Ukraine
Al Shabab FC (Riyadh) managers
FC Mulhouse managers
FC Karpaty Halych managers
Spanish expatriate football managers
Saudi Professional League managers
Saudi First Division League managers
People from Safor
Sportspeople from the Province of Valencia
1984 births
Living people